William O'Connor may refer to:

William O'Connor (fencer) (1864–1939), American fencer
William O'Connor (Australian politician) (1910–1987)
William O'Connor (darts player) (born 1986), Irish darts player
William Aloysius O'Connor (1903–1983), American prelate of the Roman Catholic Church
William D. O'Connor (1832–1889), American author
William Patrick O'Connor (1886–1973), American clergyman of the Roman Catholic Church
William Joseph O'Connor (1862–1892), Canadian professional rower - single sculls
Willie O'Connor (born 1967), Irish hurler
William O'Connor (artist) (1970–2018), American game artist

See also
Bill O'Connor (disambiguation)
Billy O'Connor, musician
William Connor (disambiguation)